The MAPS Air Museum is an aviation museum in Green, Ohio, United States. Run by the Military Aviation Preservation Society, it is located off SR241 on the west side of the Akron-Canton Regional Airport.

The museum holds more than 50 aircraft, most on loan from the U.S. Air Force or Navy for restoration. It also has two aircraft from the Goodyear Rubber Company. The aircraft are displayed in a former U.S. Air National Guard hangar and on an adjacent tarmac.

Its collection of rare artifacts includes the gondola from the "Spirit of Akron", a Goodyear blimp.

The museum's Gallery of Heroes room holds detailed models and period items from wars. Various displays highlight Pearl Harbor (artifacts include a piece of the battleship Arizona), The Tuskegee Airmen, Rosie the Riveter, and include items on loan from members of the museum and community who fought in wars.

The museum's library maintains and preserves institutional records and collects, preserves, and makes available images, literature, manuscripts, memoirs, diaries, books, and oral histories relating to military history. The library collection is open to the public with admission to the museum. Members may check books out.

History
The museum was founded in 1990 in partnership with warbird collector David Tallichet and his Military Aircraft Restoration Corporation. In 1995, the museum opened to the public, housed in the National Guard Maintenance Building on the west side of the airport. In 2000, the first air show was held at the museum. In 2001, the museum moved to the nearby former Chautauqua Airlines hangar.

In October 2018, thieves stole helmets, goggles, oxygen masks, helicopter controls and other items from the museum. Two 17-year-olds were arrested on theft charges two weeks later.

In 2020, the museum opened the hangar's newly renovated second floor, whose rental spaces include a conference room, a banquet hall, and a full-sized commercial kitchen.

Aircraft in collection

 Aero L-29 Delfín
 Aero S-106
 Beechcraft SNB-5
 Bell AH-1G Cobra
 Bell OH-58A Kiowa
 Cessna T-37A Tweet
 Cessna T-37B Tweet
 CGS Hawk Ultra
 Convair F-102A Delta Dagger
 Douglas A-4A Skyhawk
 Douglas A-26C Invader
 Douglas C-47B Skytrain
 Fairchild PT-19
 Funk Model B
 General Dynamics F-16 Fighting Falcon
 Goodyear GA-22A Drake
 Goodyear FG-1D Corsair – cockpit only
 Goodyear GZ-22 – control car only
 Grumman F9F-8P Cougar
 Grumman F11F Tiger
 Grumman F-14B Tomcat
 Grumman OV-1A Mohawk
 Grumman S-2F Tracker
 Lockheed T-33
 LTV A-7E Corsair II
 Martin B-26 Marauder
 Martin Glider
 McDonnell Douglas F-4S Phantom II
 McDonnell F-101F Voodoo
 Mikoyan-Gurevich MiG-15bis
 North American F-86A Sabre
 North American F-86L Sabre
 North American F-100D Super Sabre
 North American T-28 Trojan
 Piper PA-23-150
 Pitts S1
 PZL-Mielec Lim-6
 Republic F-84F Thunderstreak
 Republic F-105B Thunderchief
 Ryan L-17B Navion
 Sikorsky H-19 Chickasaw
 Sopwith Triplane – reproduction
 Vultee BT-13 Valiant

See also
MAPS Aero Expo
List of museums in Ohio
List of aviation museums

References

External links

MAPS Air Museum website
Where history takes flight

 

Museums established in 1991
Aerospace museums in Ohio
Military and war museums in Ohio
Museums in Summit County, Ohio
1991 establishments in Ohio